John Joseph Bennett (8 January 1801 – 29 February 1876) was a British botanist.

Bennett was assistant keeper of the Banksian herbarium and library at the British Museum from 1827 to 1858, when he succeeded Robert Brown as Keeper of the Botanical Department. He retired in 1870. He was secretary of the Linnean Society of London from 1840 to 1860. He was elected a fellow of the Royal Society in 1841, and was elected member of Leopoldina in 1864.

On the evening of 30 June 1858, Charles Lyell and Joseph Dalton Hooker passed on to him papers by Alfred Russel Wallace and Charles Darwin, titled "On the Tendency of Species to form Varieties; and on the Perpetuation of Varieties and Species by Natural Means of Selection" respectively. 
As secretary of the Linnean Society at a meeting on the following evening, 1 July, he read out the papers together with a covering note by Lyell and Hooker. 
This was the joint publication by Darwin and Wallace of their papers setting out the theory of natural selection, which was received quietly at the time but attracted wide interest when Darwin published On the Origin of Species eighteen months later.

See also
 Publication of Darwin's theory

Notes

References

 Retrieved 2006-12-15

1801 births
1876 deaths
British botanists
Botanists with author abbreviations
Employees of the Natural History Museum, London
Fellows of the Royal Society
Fellows of the Linnean Society of London